James and Fanny How House is a historic home located at Buffalo in Erie County, New York.  It is a noted example of a Tudor Revival–style dwelling designed by local architect Harold L. Olmsted in 1924.  It is composed of three sections: a -story cross-gabled front block, a 1-story gabled connecting link, and a 2-story gabled rear block with a small 1-story wing.  It has a limestone ashlar and concrete foundation and painted stucco-covered exterior walls of brick and tile.

It was listed on the National Register of Historic Places in 1997.  It is located in the Elmwood Historic District–East.

References

External links
History of the James and Fanny How House, Buffalo as an Architectural Museum website
James and Fanny How House - U.S. National Register of Historic Places on Waymarking.com

Houses on the National Register of Historic Places in New York (state)
Houses completed in 1924
Houses in Buffalo, New York
National Register of Historic Places in Buffalo, New York
Historic district contributing properties in Erie County, New York